Cristiana Isabel Gomes Garcia (born 1 September 1990) is a Portuguese football midfielder who plays for Atlético Ouriense of the Campeonato Nacional de Futebol Feminino.

International career
In April 2012, Garcia made her senior debut for the Portugal women's national football team, in a 1–0 UEFA Women's Euro 2013 qualifying defeat by Austria at Stadion Wiener Neustadt. Garcia was named by coach Francisco Neto in a provisional 25-player Portugal squad for UEFA Women's Euro 2017 in the Netherlands, but was one of two players to miss out on the final 23-woman squad.

References

External links 
 
 
 

1990 births
Living people
People from Caldas da Rainha
Portuguese women's footballers
Portugal women's international footballers
Women's association football midfielders
Atlético Ouriense players
S.C. Braga (women's football) players
Campeonato Nacional de Futebol Feminino players
Sportspeople from Leiria District